was a Japanese Shingon Risshu priest during the Kamakura period. His was instrumental in reviving Ritsu Buddhism during this period, as well as establishing facilities to care for invalids. He was criticized by his contemporary Nichiren.

He is sometimes called , or simply , as well. He was a disciple of Eison (1201 – 1290), another Ritsu priest of the period. He was born in Byōbunosato, Shikinoshimonokōri, Yamato Province, now part of Miyake in Nara Prefecture.

References

1217 births
1303 deaths
Japanese Buddhist clergy
People from Nara Prefecture
People of Kamakura-period Japan
13th-century Buddhists
Kamakura period Buddhist clergy